Gametogenetin binding protein 1 (pseudogene) is a protein that in humans is encoded by the GGNBP1 gene.

Function

This gene is the ortholog of the mouse gametogenetin-binding protein 1 gene. In human, the open reading frame is disrupted by a nonsense mutation after 8-aa; consequently, this gene is currently considered to be a unitary pseudogene in human even though it is functional in other mammals. [provided by RefSeq, Aug 2009].

References

Further reading